Barry Smith (born 15 March 1934 – 2007) was an English footballer who played as a forward in the Football League.

References

External links

1934 births
2007 deaths
English footballers
Association football forwards
Farsley Celtic A.F.C. players
Leeds United F.C. players
Bradford (Park Avenue) A.F.C. players
Wrexham A.F.C. players
Stockport County F.C. players
Oxford United F.C. players
Oldham Athletic A.F.C. players
Bangor City F.C. players
Southport F.C. players
Accrington Stanley F.C. (1891) players
English Football League players